A Gunfighter's Pledge (the working title was The Pledge) is a 2008 American Western television film starring Luke Perry. The film premiered on Hallmark Channel in July 2008. It was filmed at Big Sky Ranch in Simi Valley, California.

Plot
Ex-lawman Matt Austin (Luke Perry) accidentally kills an innocent man (Alex Paez) while hunting an outlaw who killed his family. He pledges to the dying man that he will take his body to his sister Amaya (Jaclyn DeSantis). Austin wrestles with the idea of telling her he caused the death, but is faced with bigger battles once at the farm. There he gets involved with land baron Horn (C. Thomas Howell), who is trying to take Amaya's land. Their lives are more intertwined than he thought, when he takes on Horn and discovers that Horn has hired the man he was looking for all along.

Cast
 Luke Perry as Matt Austin
 C. Thomas Howell as Horn
 Kim Coates as Tate
 Jaclyn DeSantis as Amaya
 Francesco Quinn as Sheriff
 Jorge-Luis Pallo as Samuel  
 Wyatt Smith as Billy  
 Nicholas Guest as Vaughn  
 Alex Paez as Eddie  
 Johann Urb as Lars Anderson  
 Daniel Wisler as Hank  
 James Keane as Preacher  
 Chip Sickler as Hogan  
 Jeffrey Markle as Bartender  
 Lisa Brenner as Gail Austin
 Franc Ross as Sheriff 
 Bob Ross as Town Resident
 Jordan Timsit as Jacob Austin 
 Miranda Cunha as Fellini Prostitute 
 Laci Greenfield as Suzy 
 Laura Molina as Saloon Girl

Promotion
Hallmark Channel employed guerilla marketing tactics to promote the movie. The network dispatched 20 cowboys each day from June 30 through July 2 in various places, including Times Square and Rockefeller Plaza in New York City, and Venice Beach and the Santa Monica Pier in Los Angeles. Over the three days, the cowboys engaged onlookers in showdowns and deputized locals with sheriff's badges featuring tune-in information for the film. Wild postings in the form of Old west-style wanted posters featuring an ink-block likeness of Luke Perry’s character, Matt Austin, and the phrase, "a sheriff with nothing to lose" were also put up around the cities.

Reception
When A Gunfighter's Pledge premiered on Hallmark Channel, it scored a 2.3 household rating with over 1.9 million homes. It ranked as the second-highest-rated Prime Time telecast of the day and the second-highest-rated ad-supported cable movie of the week. The movie also boosted the network to rank third in Prime Time on the day of its premiere with a 1.9 household rating. It also ranked in the top 10 during the time period among key demo ratings and delivery.

References

External links
 
 
 
 A Gunfighter's Pledge on Hallmark Channel
 A Gunfighter's Pledge on Hallmark Channel's press site

2008 television films
2008 films
2008 Western (genre) films
Films directed by Armand Mastroianni
Films set in California
Hallmark Channel original films
American Western (genre) television films
2000s English-language films